Treasure EP.2: Zero to One is the second EP by South Korean boy band Ateez. It was released on January 15, 2019, with "Say My Name" serving as the album's lead single. It debuted and peaked at number six on the Gaon Album Chart.

Track listing

Charts

Accolades

References

2019 EPs
Ateez albums